Kalateh-ye Chapar Qaleh (also Romanized as Kalāteh-ye Chāpār Qal‘eh) is a village in Kenevist Rural District, in the Central District of Mashhad County, Razavi Khorasan Province, Iran. At the 2006 census, its population was 24, in 6 families.

References 

Populated places in Mashhad County